John C. T. Conner (26 April 1898 – 1967) was a Scottish professional footballer.

Conner, a wing-half, was born in Kirkmuirhill and began his career with Alloa Athletic. He moved onto Celtic and had a loan spell with Dykehead before joining Plymouth Argyle in 1925. He failed to break into the Argyle first team and moved to Newport County, making 14 appearances in the 1926–27 season.

He joined Torquay United in 1927 and captained the side in their first ever game in the Football League, against Exeter City on 27 August 1927. He left Plainmoor after only one season having made 24 appearances.

1898 births
1967 deaths
Footballers from South Lanarkshire
Scottish footballers
Alloa Athletic F.C. players
Celtic F.C. players
Plymouth Argyle F.C. players
Newport County A.F.C. players
Torquay United F.C. players
Association football midfielders
Scottish Football League players
Dykehead F.C. players